Cycling at the 2011 European Youth Summer Olympic Festival was held from 26 to 28 July 2011. The competitions took place at the Trabzon-Rize Highway, Turkey.

Medal summary

Medal table

Medal events

See also
 European Youth Olympic Festival

References

European Youth Summer Olympic Festival
2011 European Youth Summer Olympic Festival
International cycle races hosted by Turkey
2011 European Youth Summer Olympics
2011 in cycle racing